Puerto Rican singer Rauw Alejandro has released three studio albums, one live album and two extended plays (EP). He also released 80 singles, including 15 promotional singles and 28 as featured artist. He was the top new Latin artist of 2021 and the second top Latin artist of the year overall, according to Billboard.

His debut EP, Trap Cake, Vol. 1 was released in 2019, and his debut studio album, Afrodisíaco was released the following year. Afrodisíaco peaked at number three on the US Billboard Top Latin Albums chart and has been nominated for a Grammy award. The album spawned hit singles "Reloj" and "Tattoo" (remix). Both songs reached the top 10 on the US Billboard Hot Latin Songs. Alejandro's second studio album, Vice Versa was released in June 2021. The album topped Billboard Top Latin Albums and featured his biggest hit "Todo de Ti", as well as "2/Catorce", "Cúrame", and "Desesperados". His second extended play, Trap Cake, Vol. 2, was released on February 25, 2022. Alejandro released his third studio album, Saturno in November 2022, which features "Lokera" and "Punto 40".

Besides material for his albums, Alejandro has recorded several collaborations and non-album singles, including "Toda" (remix), "Fantasías", "La Nota", "Baila Conmigo", and "Nostálgico".

Albums

Studio albums

Live albums

EPs

Mixtapes

Singles

As lead artist

As featured artist

Promotional singles

Charity singles

Other charted and certified songs

Guest appearances

Footnotes 

 Note 1: Uses combined chart entries for "Tattoo" and "Tattoo (remix)".

References

Discographies of Puerto Rican artists
Rauw Alejandro
Reggaeton discographies